Alvin Brian McDonald (February 18, 1936 – September 4, 2018) was a Canadian professional ice hockey forward.

Career
Born in Winnipeg, Manitoba, McDonald began his professional hockey career with the Montreal Canadiens of the National Hockey League (NHL) in 1958.  He later played for the Chicago Black Hawks, Detroit Red Wings, Boston Bruins, Pittsburgh Penguins, and St. Louis Blues. He won four straight Stanley Cups: three with Montreal followed by another with Chicago. He was the first team captain of the Penguins and Winnipeg Jets organizations, and scored the first goal for the Jets in the World Hockey Association (WHA). He ended his career after 147 games for Winnipeg, retiring after the 1973–74 season. He died at his home in Winnipeg from cancer on September 4, 2018, at the age of 82.

Career statistics

Awards and achievements
MJHL Second All-Star Team (1953)
Turnbull Cup MJHL Championships (1953 and 1954)
MJHL Scoring Champion (1954)
NHL All-Star Game (1958, 1959, 1961, 1969 and 1970)
Stanley Cup Championships (1958, 1959, 1960 and 1961)
Inducted into the Manitoba Sports Hall of Fame and Museum in 1996
"Honoured Member" of the Manitoba Hockey Hall of Fame

Transactions
June 7, 1960 – Traded to Chicago by Montreal with Reggie Fleming, Bob Courcy and Cec Hoekstra for Glen Skov, Terry Gray, Bob Bailey, Lorne Ferguson and the rights to Danny Lewicki. 
June 8, 1964 – Traded to Boston by Chicago with Reggie Fleming for Doug Mohns.
May 31, 1965 – Traded to Detroit by Boston with Bob McCord and Ken Stephanson for Albert Langlois, Ron Harris, Parker MacDonald and Bob Dillabough.
June 6, 1967 – Claimed by Pittsburgh from Detroit in Expansion Draft.
June 11, 1968 – Traded to St. Louis by Pittsburgh for Lou Angotti.
May 12, 1971 – Traded to Detroit by St. Louis with Bob Wall and Mike Lowe to complete transaction that sent Carl Brewer to St. Louis (February 22, 1971).
February 12, 1972 – Selected by Winnipeg (WHA) in 1972 WHA General Player Draft.

References

External links

1936 births
2018 deaths
Boston Bruins players
Canadian ice hockey forwards
Chicago Blackhawks players
Detroit Red Wings players
Montreal Canadiens players
Pittsburgh Hornets players
Pittsburgh Penguins players
Providence Reds players
Rochester Americans players
St. Boniface Canadiens players
St. Louis Blues players
Ice hockey people from Winnipeg
Manitoba Sports Hall of Fame inductees
Stanley Cup champions
Tidewater Wings players
Winnipeg Jets (WHA) players